Clayrack Drainage Windmill is located at How Hill in the English county of Norfolk. It is on the east bank of the River Ant close to How Hill, a large Edwardian building which houses the Norfolk Broads Study Centre. The Drainage mill is 1¾ miles west of the village of Ludham.

Description
Clayrack Drainage Windmill is of an interesting design being one of only two ‘Hollow Post’ drainage mills left on the broads and the only one fitted with a scoop wheel. The mill has a miniature cap, sails and fantail based on its more traditional big brother tower drainage mills which can be seen on other parts of the Norfolk Broads. Just to the south of this windmill on the same side of the river Ant is another small interesting drainage windmill called Boardman's Windmill. Clayrack takes its name from the Fen it stands on.

History 
Clayrack drainage windmill is not on its original position. It was moved in 1981 from its previous site on Ranworth Marshes 2¾ miles to the south. The mill was in a terrible state of repair and was in danger of being lost for ever. It was decided that it was worth saving and a restoration program was set up.  As Ranworth marsh hosted many nesting birds which would have been vulnerable to any disturbance caused by the work the decision was taken to move Clayrack windpump to its present position at How Hill. Now fully restored the mill can sometimes be seen operating in its original capacity as a drainage pump.

References 

Windmills in Norfolk
Windmills of the Norfolk Broads
Post mills in the United Kingdom
Windpumps in the United Kingdom
Windmills completed in 1981
Ludham